Air Chief Marshal Nirmal Chandra Suri, PVSM, AVSM, VM, ADC (born 26 July 1933) was the 15th Chief of Air Staff of the Indian Air Force, from 31 July 1991 to 31 July 1993. He is an alumnus of the famous Royal Indian Military College, Dehradun. He was a part of the First course of the Joint Services Wing, the present-day National Defence Academy, Pune. He was commissioned in the Indian Air Force as a fighter pilot on15 March 1952. During the Indo-Pakistani War of 1965, Suri was selected to lead the detachment from No.20 Hawker Hunter Squadron and he flew several sorties during the war. In 1969, he was awarded the Vayu Sena Medal for his contributions and devotion to service.

During the 1971 War, Suri took over the Number 7 Hunter Squadron and he flew several sorties during this war as well. He was awarded the Ati Vishisht Seva Medal or AVSM in 1982. 

He became the Chief of Air Staff on 1 August 1991 and was instrumental in various initiatives – including the induction of women officers in the IAF first as ground duty officers and later as pilots. He has always been a passionate flyer and he is not known to have passed on any opportunity to fly. Air Chief Marshal N. C. Suri retired from service on 31 July 1993 and was succeeded by S. K. Kaul.

References

1933 births
Chiefs of Air Staff (India)
Vice Chiefs of Air Staff (India)
Living people
Rashtriya Indian Military College alumni
Indian Air Force air marshals
Military personnel from Punjab, India
Recipients of the Param Vishisht Seva Medal
Recipients of the Ati Vishisht Seva Medal
Indian Air Force officers
National Defence College, India alumni